Amir Yusuf Pohan  is an Indonesian football midfielder who played for Indonesia at the 2002 AFF Championship. He also played for Medan Jaya, PKT Bontang, PS Barito Putera, PSPS Pekanbaru, Persiba Balikpapan and Persibom Bolaang Mongondow.

Career
He scored 17 goals for PKT Bontang in the 1994 season, being in the top ten in the league.

In his post-playing career, he has worked as an assistant coach for Martapura FC. He is also associated with Mandailing FC.

References

External links

1971 births
Living people
Indonesian footballers
Association football midfielders
Indonesia international footballers
Medan Jaya players
PKT Bontang players
PS Barito Putera players
PSPS Pekanbaru players
Persiba Balikpapan players
Persibom Bolaang Mongondow players